Khomestan or Khamestan may refer to:
 Khomestan, Lorestan, Iran
 Khamestan, Markazi, Iran